Félix Pita Rodriguez (1909-1990) was a Cuban journalist, poet and literary critic. He was born in Bejucal. An active communist, Rodriguez helped to found the Ibero-American Anti-Fascist Committee during the Spanish Civil War. His literary acquaintances included Pablo Neruda. He was exiled from Cuba for many years, living in Latin America and Europe. After Castro's overthrow of the Batista government, he returned to Cuba in 1960. He won Cuba's National Literary Prize in 1985.

Works
 San Abul de Montecallado, 1945
 Corcel de Fuego, 1948 
 Tobías, 1955  
 Las Noches, 1964 
 Historia tan Natural, 1971 
 Niños de Vietnam, 1974
 Poesía y Prosa, 1976 
 La Pipa de Cerezo, 1987
 Asesor Literario de la Serie de la TV Cubana- En silencio ha tenido que ser, 1979

References

Cuban male poets
Cuban journalists
Male journalists
Cuban literary critics
1909 births
1990 deaths
20th-century journalists